The British Empire Economic Conference (also known as the Imperial Economic Conference or Ottawa Conference) was a 1932 conference of British colonies and dominions held to discuss the Great Depression. It was held between 21 July and 20 August in Ottawa.

The conference saw the group admit the failure of the gold standard and abandon attempts to return to it. The meeting also worked to establish a zone of limited tariffs within the British Empire, but with high tariffs with the rest of the world. This was called "Imperial preference" or "Empire Free-Trade" on the principle of "home producers first, empire producers second, and foreign producers last". The result of the conference was a series of bilateral agreements that would last for at least 5 years. This abandonment of open free trade led to a split in the British National Government coalition: the Official Liberals under Herbert Samuel left the Government, but the National Liberals under Sir John Simon remained.

The conference was especially notable for its adoption of Keynesian ideas such as lowering interest rates, increasing the money supply, and expanding government spending.

Heads of delegations

The conference was hosted by the Governor General of Canada, The Earl of Bessborough, representing King George V and included the Prime Ministers and other leaders of the Empire and members of their respective cabinets:

See also 

 Import Duties Act 1932
 Imperial Conference

Notes

Sources 

 British Empire Economic Conference, Time magazine, 25 July 1932
 Barry Eichengreen and Douglas A. Irwin, "Trade blocs, currency blocs and the reorientation of world trade in the 1930s", Journal of International Economics, Volume 38, Issues 1–2, February 1995, Pages 1–24
 Robert A. MacKay, "Imperial Economics at Ottawa", Pacific Affairs, Vol. 5, No. 10 (Oct. 1932), pp. 873–885
 Maxwell Slutz Stewart, The Ottawa conference, Foreign Policy Association, incorporated, 1932
 

Imperial Conference
History of the Commonwealth of Nations
20th-century diplomatic conferences
1932 in Canada
1932 in economics
1932 in international relations
Diplomatic conferences in Canada
Great Depression
Gold standard
Ireland and the Commonwealth of Nations
1932 conferences
Economic Conference
1930s in Ottawa
July 1932 events
August 1932 events
1932 in Ontario
Stanley Baldwin